Fun Republic Mall may refer to:

Fun Republic Mall (Coimbatore), a shopping mall in Coimbatore, India
Fun Republic Mall (Lucknow), a shopping mall in Lucknow, India